St. Thomas Dayara is a monastery of the Malankara Orthodox Syrian Church situated in Vettikkal, about five kilometres from Mulanthuruthy in Kerala.

History

In the year 1125, on the first Sunday after Easter, a cross brought from St. Thomas Church, Mulanthuruthy was erected at 
Vettikkal, which was the then border point  between the Royal Provinces of Kochi and Travancore, in the name of India's Apostle and our Guardian Saint Blessed St. Thomas.

This ancient Holy Cross is still retained on the east side wall of the Dayara building. In the year 1200 it was declared a Chapel.

Kattumangattu Junior Bava Geevarghese Coorilose (second Bishop of Thozhiyoor Church) who died in 1809, is buried in this Dayara. He is considered a saint by the local faithful, who celebrate his feast on 28 and 29 May. Thousands of people irrespective of religious affiliations attend this every year and receive blessings.

In 1877, Parumala Thirumeni and the Malankara Metropolitan, after 40 days of meditation and fasting, consecrated the renovated Dayara and the Holy Madbaha. Soon after the consecration ceremony, the 'first Holy Synod of Malankara Church' was conducted in the Dayara. The Malankara Church was demarcated into seven dioceses in this Synod with Bishops being assigned to each Diocese.

In 1976, Metropolitan Joseph Pakkomios renovated the Dayara. On 10 December 1976, in the centenary year of Parumala Thirumeni's ordination as Metropolitan, the holy relics of Parumala Thirumeni were transferred and interred here.

In 1977, on 10 December, a Chapel in the upper floor of the Dayara was consecrated by Baselious Marthoma Mathews I, the Catholicose.

Pictures

References

External links
 Official Website
 Malankara Sabha History
 Website of Malankara Orthodox Syrian Church

Malankara Orthodox Syrian church buildings
Churches in Ernakulam District